is a 1992 Formula One racing video game developed by KID. One or two players can pit themselves in three Grand Prix races. Each of the different team cars have different color schemes. The courses vary from blacktop to concrete, and rain is also included and is implemented in the game.

Gameplay

The players can pick from 40 fictional drivers and 24 teams to play with. The game is always shown in split-screen mode, even when the player is playing on his own, in this case the opponent directly behind or ahead of the player is shown in the other window. Car settings can be adjusted in the garage. Pit stops can be used to repair the car during a race. Crashing the car can also force the player to retire from the race early.

In the game the player can choose from four game modes: Survival - Finish at or lower than a certain position (determined by your difficulty) to continue to the next race, Champion(ship), VS, and Slot - In this game mode steering happens automatically. The only thing the players need to concern themselves with is the gas and brake pedals.

The game features three difficulty levels: Beginner, Pro and Expert.

Reception 

Battle Grand Prix received mixed reception from critics, most of which reviewed it as an import title. Joysticks Jean-Marc Demoly commended the game's audiovisual presentation and controls. In contrast, Joypads Ho U. felt more mixed when it came to the graphics, sprite animations, controls and sound. The British magazine Super Pro noted that it was difficult getting to grips with but claimed that the title was more enjoyable than F-1 Grand Prix due to its two-player mode and realism. Nintendo Power gave positive remarks to the amount of game modes, car customization and number of tracks but criticized the car sprites for their small size and lack of realistic driving fell, lack of race track map and inability to choose a computer opponent to race against. Likewise, Electronic Gaming Monthlys four reviewers commended its numerous option settings to customize the game, as well as the different types of modes and courses but criticized its gameplay for lacking in the controls department and the overhead split screen perspective for being annoying and blocking incoming obstacles, regarding it to be a simple and average racer. 

Reviewing the Japanese release, Computer and Video Games Paul Rand commended its clear and bright visuals but criticized the sound for its engine noise and poor music, irritating gameplay and poorly-implemented control system, stating that "Battle Grand Prix is a rather dull and insipid affair best avoided." Video Games Jan Barysch found the idea of changing weather during the race to be nice and the distance bar as useful to avoid collision with an opponent, but stated that its graphics were mediocre and gameplay was below-average. Play Times Robert Reischmann noted its split screen perspective, two-player mode and lack of saving options. While giving positive remarks to the visuals, Reischmann felt mixed when it came to the sound and controls, stating that the game's ideas get "miserably lost in a concept that is obviously not thought through to the end." Aktueller Software Markts Michael Suck praised the title for its audiovisual presentation and realism.

Notes

References

External links 

 Battle Grand Prix at GameFAQs
 Battle Grand Prix at Giant Bomb
 Battle Grand Prix at MobyGames

1992 video games
Hudson Soft games
Kaga Create games
KID games
Multiplayer and single-player video games
Racing video games
Super Nintendo Entertainment System games
Super Nintendo Entertainment System-only games
Top-down video games
Video games developed in Japan
Video games set in Canada
Video games set in Toronto